Aldona is one of the 40 Goa Legislative Assembly constituencies of the state of Goa in southern India. Aldona is also one of the 20 constituencies falling under the North Goa Lok Sabha constituency.

Members of the Legislative Assembly

Election results

2022

2017

2012

See also
 List of constituencies of the Goa Legislative Assembly
 North Goa district

References

External links
 

North Goa district
Assembly constituencies of Goa